The Salmon-Stohlman House, also known as Clover Crest, is a historic home located at Somerset, Montgomery County, Maryland.  It is a -story, frame structure built about 1893, and designed in a transitional manner with late Victorian detailing.  It was one of the first houses built in the present day Town of Somerset by Dr. Daniel Salmon, a leading veterinarian at the U.S. Department of Agriculture, and one of the original developers of the suburban property.

It was listed on the National Register of Historic Places in 2002.

Victoria Clarke is a former resident of the Salmon-Stohlman House.

References

External links
, including photo in 2001, at Maryland Historical Trust website

Houses on the National Register of Historic Places in Maryland
Houses completed in 1893
Houses in Montgomery County, Maryland
Victorian architecture in Maryland
National Register of Historic Places in Montgomery County, Maryland